Carole Freeman (born January 10, 1949) is a lawyer and politician in Quebec. She was a Member of Parliament representing the Bloc Québécois for the riding of Châteauguay—Saint-Constant from 2006 to 2011.

External links
 

Bloc Québécois MPs
1949 births
Women members of the House of Commons of Canada
Living people
Members of the House of Commons of Canada from Quebec
People from Châteauguay
Women in Quebec politics
21st-century Canadian politicians
21st-century Canadian women politicians